José Luis Gómez may refer to:

 José Luis Gómez (actor) (born 1940), Spanish actor and director
 José Luis Gómez (footballer) (born 1993), Argentine footballer
 José Luis Gómez Martínez (born 1943), Spanish professor
 Joselu (footballer, born 1990), born José Luis Gómez Hurtado, Spanish footballer